Dila Sangraula Pant (Nepali: डिला संग्रौला पंत) is a Nepali politician and a member of the House of Representatives of the federal parliament of Nepal. In May 2019, she was elected the minister of labour of the shadow cabinet formed by the main opposition of the parliament, Nepali Congress.

As of 2016, she is the president of Nepal Woman Association, the women wing of Nepali Congress.

References

Living people
Nepali Congress politicians from Koshi Province
21st-century Nepalese women politicians
21st-century Nepalese politicians
Nepal MPs 2017–2022
1963 births